Mervana Jugić-Salkić and Darija Jurak were the defending champions; however, Jugić-Salkić decided not to participate. Jurak partnered up with Renata Voráčová and lost in the final to Anna-Lena Grönefeld and Petra Martić 1–6, 6–2, [11–9].

Seeds

Draw

Draw

References
 Doubles Draw

Open GDF Suez de Cagnes-sur-Mer Alpes-Maritimes - Doubles